Orophia madagascariensis is a species of moth in the family Depressariidae. It was described by Viette in 1951, and is known from Madagascar.

The larvae feed on fern species.

References

Moths described in 1951
Orophia
Moths of Madagascar
Moths of Africa